The Battle of the Bulge: Tigers in the Snow is a turn-based strategy computer wargame, made in 1981 by Chuck Kroegel, David Landrey, and David Walker for the Apple II, Atari 8-bit, and TRS-80. It was later ported to the IBM PC and Commodore 64.

It was the first video game to feature the Battle of the Bulge of 1944 and 1945, a decisive Allied victory over German forces in World War II, as its subject. Heavily inspired by board games, the game was played on a hexagonal grid and included such features as a supply, terrain and weather system.

Reception
Richard Charles Karr reviewed the game for Computer Gaming World, writing:

A 1993 Computer Gaming World survey of wargames gave Tigers in the Snow one star out of five, stating that its primitive graphics, play mechanics, and user interface "have been superseded by more recent efforts".

References

1981 video games
Apple II games
Atari 8-bit family games
Battle of the Bulge
Commodore 64 games
DOS games
Strategic Simulations games
TRS-80 games
Turn-based strategy video games
Video games about the Battle of the Bulge
Video games developed in the United States
World War II video games